Walter Place may refer to:

People
Walter Place (footballer, born 1869), English association footballer for Burnley, Colne and Bacup
Walter Place (footballer, born 1872), English association footballer for Burnley and Woolwich Arsenal

Location
Walter Place (Holly Springs, Mississippi), a historic mansion in Holly Springs, Mississippi, USA